Cross-border cooperation is the collaboration between adjacent areas across borders. In the European Union this is one of the forms of territorial cooperation (in addition to transnational and interregional cooperation). The European model is very diverse with cooperation between border regions or municipalities, or through specific cooperation structures. These structures are usually composed by public authorities (municipalities, districts, counties, regions) from different countries organized in working communities, euroregions or EGTCs (European Grouping of Territorial Cooperation).

Cross-border collaboration at internal borders of the European Union

Interreg 
European Territorial Cooperation, also commonly known as Interreg, is a key instrument from the European Cohesion policy supporting cross-border Interreg A  cooperation across Europe. For the fifth programming period 2014-2020 Interreg  A is exclusively funded through the European Regional Development Fund with EUR 6.6 billion for the fifth programming period, amounting for 1.9% of the total EU cohesion policy budget for 2014–2020.

EGTC 
The European Grouping of Territorial Cooperation (EGTC)  enables public bodies, regional and local authorities, associations and also EU Member States to create a new cooperation entity with a legal personality. The inception of this new instrument for cooperation at Community level in the framework of regional policy was in 2006. The establishment of a cooperation groupings aims to overcome the obstacles hindering cooperation across borders such as geographical, natural, cultural or administrative borders. EGTC facilitate cross-border, transnational and interregional cooperation by co-financing projects through European funds or without EU financial support.  
EGTC programmes are regulated under the framework of the Regulation (EC) No 1082/2006.

Cross-border collaboration at external borders of the European Union

Interreg IPA CBC
Interreg Instrument for pre-accession Assistance (IPA) II contributes jointly to the pre-accession process for the period 2014–2020. Assistance is provided to 7 candidate countries and potential candidates from the Western Balkans and Turkey. As a single framework for candidates and potential candidates, IPA aims to foster cooperation between Member States and candidate/potential candidates and also among the candidate/ potential candidate countries. Thus, IPA is the instrument established by the EU to strengthen institutional capacity by providing them assistance and technical help in administrative, political, social and economic reforms. The new design of IPA, following up IPA 2007–2013, focus on a more strategic approach.  For each country there is a strategic paper with a specific agenda promoting structural reforms and setting up priorities. Also a multi-Country Strategy Paper addresses priorities for regional cooperation or territorial cooperation.
 Budget allocation for IPA 2014-2020: EUR 11.7 billion 
 Beneficiary countries: Albania, Bosnia and Herzegovina, Kosovo, Macedonia, Montenegro, Serbia and Turkey

ENI CBC
Interreg and the European Neighbourhood Instrument (ENI) finance jointly programmes strengthening bilateral relations between EU Member States and partner countries laying on the East and South of the EU's borders. Cooperation are especially in sectors like democracy, human rights, the rule of law, good governance and sustainable development. 
 Budget allocation for ENI 2014-2020: EUR 15,433 billion + 10 million Euros from IPA for the participation of Turkey
 Beneficiary countries: Algeria, Armenia, Azerbaijan, Belarus, Egypt, Georgia, Israel, Jordan, Leba-non, Libya, Moldova, Morocco, Norway, Palestine, Russia, Ukraine, Tunisia, Syria. Turkey participates from IPA allocation.

List

See also 
 European Regional Development Fund 
 Budget of the European Union
 Treaty of Lisbon
 Europe 2020
 Euroregions

References

External links 
 Official EU website for regional policy
 European Commission on Interreg
 European Commission on EGTC
 EGTC
 Committee of the Regions on EGTC
 Interact on EGTC
 cbc.ab.gov.tr
 http://blacksea-cbc.net/
 http://www.ipacbc-bgtr.eu/

International trade
Cross-border regions
Transnationalism